Hemidactylus granosus is a species of gecko. It is found on the Sinai Peninsula in Egypt and in Saudi Arabia.

References

Hemidactylus
Reptiles described in 1827
Taxa named by Carl von Heyden
Reptiles of the Middle East
Fauna of Egypt
Reptiles of the Arabian Peninsula